"All I Wanna Do" is a pop song written by Lilley/Cook and recorded by Australian blues, rock and R&B band Jo Jo Zep & The Falcons. The song was released in April 1980 as the lead single from the band's fifth studio album Hats Off Step Lively (1980).

The song peaked at number 34 on the Kent Music Report in Australia.

Track listing 
7" (K 7897) 
Side A "All I Wanna Do" - 3:04
Side B "Too Hot To Touch" - 2:33

7" (UK) (WEA – K 79149)
Side A "All I Wanna Do" - 3:04
Side B "Thin Line"

Charts

References 

1980 songs
1980 singles
Mushroom Records singles
Jo Jo Zep & The Falcons songs